Haematopota rara is a species of horse flies (insects in the family Tabanidae).

Distribution
United States.

References

Tabanidae
Insects described in 1912
Taxa named by Charles Willison Johnson
Diptera of North America